Cyril Aubrey Kemp (12 June 1915 — 25 December 2010) was an Irish tennis player active in the 1930s, 1940s and 1950s. He was also a national representative in the sports of squash and table tennis.

The son of an all-round sportsman, Kemp had his best period on the tennis tour in the late 1940s, debuting for the Ireland Davis Cup team in 1946. He was singles runner-up at the Irish championships in 1946 and 1947. His run at the 1947 Irish championships included an upset semi-final win over Tom Brown, who was fresh off making a Wimbledon final. In 1948 he won through to the third round at Wimbledon, before losing to the top seeded Frank Parker.

See also
List of Ireland Davis Cup team representatives

References

External links
 
 
 

1915 births
2010 deaths
Irish male tennis players
Irish table tennis players
Irish squash players